The year 1922 in architecture involved some significant architectural events and new buildings.

Events
 Construction work begins on The Los Angeles Central Library in Los Angeles, California, United States.
 Construction of Böttcherstraße in Bremen, Germany, in the style of Brick Expressionism begins.
 Monument to the Third International, designed by Vladimir Tatlin, is cancelled.

Buildings and structures

Buildings opened

 March 21 – Rebuilt London Waterloo station with war memorial entrance is officially opened (engineers: J. W. Jacomb-Hood and A. W. Szlumper; architect: J. R. Scott).
 May 30 – Lincoln Memorial in Washington, D.C., United States is dedicated by William H. Taft, in the presence of Abraham Lincoln's son, 79-year-old Robert Todd Lincoln.
 June 9 – Spalding War Memorial in England, designed by Sir Edwin Lutyens, is dedicated.
 October 14 – Gerrards Cross Memorial Building in England, designed by Sir Edwin Lutyens, is dedicated.
 November 26 – Rochdale Cenotaph in England, designed by Sir Edwin Lutyens, is dedicated.

Buildings completed

 Estonian Constituent Assembly (Riigikogu) building in Toompea Castle, designed by Eugen Habermann and Herbert Johanson.
 Church of the Sacred Heart and St Catherine of Alexandria (Roman Catholic) Droitwich Spa, England, by Frank B. Peacock.
 Antiguo Casino de Ponce, Puerto Rico, by Agustin Camilo Gonzalez.
 Phitsanulok Mansion in Bangkok, by Mario Tamagno.
 Shabolovka tower in Moscow, Russian Soviet Federative Socialist Republic, by Vladimir Shukhov.
 Wolseley Motors showrooms, 160 Piccadilly, London, by W. Curtis Green.
 Wrigley Building in Chicago, Illinois, by Graham, Anderson, Probst & White.
 Shukhov Tower in Moscow, by Vladimir Shukhov.

Awards
 AIA Gold Medal – Victor Laloux
 RIBA Royal Gold Medal – Thomas Hastings
 Grand Prix de Rome, architecture: Robert Giroud.

Births
 January 4 – Mart Port, Estonian architect (died 2012)
 March 14 – Colin St John Wilson, English architect (died 2007)
 April 13 – Valve Pormeister, Estonian architect (died 2002)
 May 29 – Iannis Xenakis, Greek composer, music theorist and architect-engineer (died 2001)
 June 14 – Kevin Roche, Irish-born American Pritzker Prize-winning architect (died 2019)
 Bill Howell, British architect (died 1974)

Deaths

 April 18 – Hjalmar Welhaven, Norwegian architect, palace manager and sportsman (born 1850)
 July 21 – Eugène Vallin, French architect, furniture designer and manufacturer (born 1856)
 September 19 – Benjamin D. Price, American architect known principally for his catalogue sales of plans for churches (born 1845)
 December 4 – Hermann Baagøe Storck, Danish architect and heraldist (born 1839)
 December 8 – Ernest George, English architect and painter (born 1839)
 William Henry Miller, American architect based in Ithaca, New York (born 1848)

References